Coleophora pechi is a moth of the family Coleophoridae that is endemic to Algeria.

The larvae feed on Suaeda vermiculata. They feed within stem galls on their host plant.

References

External links

pechi
Moths of Africa
Endemic fauna of Algeria
Moths described in 1888